Elaphrus riparius is a species of ground beetle native to the Palearctic and the Near East. In Europe, it is found in Austria, Belarus, Belgium, Great Britain including Shetland, Orkney, Hebrides and Isle of Man, Bulgaria, Croatia, the Czech Republic, mainland Denmark, Estonia, Finland, mainland France, Germany, Hungary, Republic of Ireland, mainland Italy (doubtful), Kaliningrad, Latvia, Liechtenstein, Lithuania, Luxembourg, Northern Ireland, mainland Norway, Poland, Russia, Slovakia, Slovenia, mainland Spain, Sweden, Switzerland, the Netherlands, Ukraine and Yugoslavia.

External links
Elaphrus riparius at Fauna Europaea
Global Biodiversity Information Facility

Elaphrinae
Beetles described in 1758
Taxa named by Carl Linnaeus